Dan-D Foods Ltd is a Canadian food company that acts as an importer, manufacturer and distributor of cashews, dried fruits, rice crackers, snack foods, spices, and other packaged foods from around the world. The company's products are distributed under its own trademarks of Dan-D-Bulk, Dan-D-Pak and Dan-D-Organic with the slogan "Fine Foods of the Earth". Today, Dan-D Foods Group Global operates its business in six countries, and distributes its products, with recent expansions, as far as Australia.

Notes

External links
 Website of Dan-D Foods' Dan-D-Pak brand
 Bloomberg Businessweek listing for Dan-D Foods Limited
 

1989 establishments in British Columbia
Canadian brands
Companies based in Richmond, British Columbia
Companies established in 1989
Food and drink companies of Canada
Privately held companies of Canada
Food and drink companies established in 1989